The 2019 Louisville City FC season is the club's fifth season in Louisville, Kentucky playing in the United Soccer League Championship, which as of 2019 is the second-tier league in the United States soccer league system.

This was Louisville City's final season at Louisville Slugger Field, a baseball park in downtown Louisville. The team will open the new Lynn Family Stadium in the nearby Butchertown neighborhood for the 2020 season.

Current squad

Transfers

In

Out

Loans in

Competitions

Exhibitions 
All times in Eastern time.

USL Championship

Eastern Conference standings

Results summary 

On December 19, 2018, the USL announced their 2019 season schedule.
All times in regular season on Eastern Daylight Time (UTC-04:00)

Results

USL Championship Playoffs

U.S. Open Cup 

As a member of the USL Championship, Louisville City entered the tournament in the Second Round, with their Cup opener played on May 15, 2019.

Player statistics

Top scorers

Assist leaders

Clean sheets

Disciplinary

References

Louisville City FC seasons
Louisville City FC
Louisville City
Louisville City